Charles Arthur Hollick (February 6, 1857 – March 11, 1933), known widely as Arthur Hollick, was an American paleobotanist. He was curator of fossil plants at Columbia University and the New York Botanical Garden.

Biography
Arthur Hollick was born in New Brighton, Staten Island, New York on February 6, 1857. He received a Bachelor of Philosophy from Columbia School of Mines in 1879 and his doctorate at George Washington University (then known as Columbian College) in 1897.  

He died on March 11, 1933.

References

External links
 

1857 births
1933 deaths
Paleobotanists
People from Staten Island
New York Botanical Garden
Columbian College of Arts and Sciences alumni
Columbia School of Mines alumni
Scientists from New York (state)